Harisimran Singh Sandhu (born 4 January 1950) is an Indian sports shooter. He competed in the mixed skeet event at the 1984 Summer Olympics.

References

1950 births
Living people
Indian male sport shooters
Olympic shooters of India
Shooters at the 1984 Summer Olympics
Place of birth missing (living people)